Sturisoma caquetae is a species of armored catfish of the family Loricariidae endemic to Colombia where it occurs in the Caquetá River basin.

References

Harttiini
Catfish of South America
Freshwater fish of Colombia
Endemic fauna of Colombia
Taxa named by Henry Weed Fowler
Fish described in 1945